Cosmetalepas, common name the pitted keyhole limpets, is a genus of minute deepwater keyhole limpets, marine gastropod mollusks or micromollusks in the family Fissurellidae, the keyhole limpets and slit limpets.

Species
 Cosmetalepas africana Tomlin, 1926 
 Cosmetalepas concatenata (Crosse & Fischer, 1864) 
 Cosmetalepas massieri Poppe, Tagaro & Sarino, 2011 
 Cosmetalepas scutellum (Gmelin) 
Species brought into synonymy
 Cosmetalepas africanus [sic] : synonym of Cosmetalepas africana (Tomlin, 1926)
 Cosmetalepas concatenatus (Crosse & Fischer, 1864): synonym of Cosmetalepas concatenata (Crosse & Fischer, 1864)

References

Fissurellidae
Gastropod genera